Da Man is the debut studio album by Swedish singer Frans. It was released in December 2006 in Sweden through Universal Music AB. It has peaked at number 20 on the Swedish Albums Chart. The album includes the singles "Who's da Man" and "Kul med Jul".

Singles
"Who's da Man" was released as the lead single from the album on 17 May 2006. The song peaked to number one on the Swedish Singles Chart. The song is a praise of the football player Zlatan Ibrahimović. "Kul med Jul" was released as the second single from the album on 4 December 2006. The song peaked at number 24 on the Swedish Singles Chart.

Track listing

Charts performance

Weekly charts

Release history

References

2006 albums
Frans Jeppsson Wall albums